Theekkali is a 1981 Indian Malayalam film,  directed by J. Sasikumar and produced by P. Stanley. This is inspired by Shammi Kapoor super hit movie China Town. The film stars Prem Nazir, Jayabharathi, Adoor Bhasi and Sankaradi in the lead roles. The film has musical score by G. Devarajan.

Cast
Prem Nazir
Jayabharathi
Adoor Bhasi
Sankaradi
Shubha
Sreelatha Namboothiri
K. P. Ummer
Meena
Sudheer

Soundtrack
The music was composed by G. Devarajan and the lyrics were written by M. D. Rajendran and G. Devarajan.

References

External links
 

1981 films
1980s Malayalam-language films
Malayalam remakes of Hindi films